Lo Duca or LoDuca is a surname. Notable people with the surname include:

Joseph LoDuca (born 1958), American composer
Joseph-Marie Lo Duca (1905–2004), Italian writer
Paul Lo Duca (born 1972), American baseball player
Tim Lo Duca (born 1985), Slovenian football player

Italian-language surnames